Nova Sport is a Bulgarian sports television channel, part of Nova Broadcasting Group, owned by United Group. The channel launched in 2010 and replaced the music channel MM. It broadcasts live sports events like football, boxing, athletics, golf, basketball, volleyball and others. The television was created with resemblance to the Scandinavian channel Viasat Sport, owned by Modern Times Group (then owner of Nova Broadcasting Group), which shares the same graphic package.

Nova Premier League HD
On 2 April 2012, MTG launched a 24/7 HD channel – Nova Premier League HD – that broadcasts only Premier League football in high definition. It was distributed from Viasat and broadcast from London. It aired Premier League-related magazines, studio programs, and live, delayed and classic matches every day around the clock. The channel is created as resemblance to the Scandinavian channel Viasat Premier League HD and uses the same graphic package as Viasat Fotboll. The channel closed on 1 June 2013 as the main channel Nova Sport began broadcasting in HD from 29 July 2013.

List of sports events transmitted by Nova Sport and Diema Sport
 Bulgarian A Football Group
 Premier League
 Bulgarian Cup
 Ligue 1
 DFB-Pokal
 UEFA European Football Championship – qualifications
 Football League Championship
 Football League Cup
 Boxing
 FA Cup

Logos

Television networks in Bulgaria
Bulgarian-language television stations
Modern Times Group